Maurice Jerome Meisner (November 17, 1931 – January 23, 2012) was a historian of 20th century China and professor at the University of Wisconsin–Madison. His study of the Chinese Revolution and the People's Republic was in conjunction with his strong interest in socialist ideology, Marxism, and Maoism in particular. He authored a number of books including Mao's China: A History of the People's Republic (and subsequent editions) which became a standard academic text in that area.

Maurice Meisner was born in Detroit, Michigan in 1931 to Jewish immigrants from Eastern Europe. He had two marriages each lasting about 30 years, first to Lorraine Faxon Meisner and subsequently to Lynn Lubkeman. He had three children from the first marriage and one child from the second. He died at his home in Madison, Wisconsin in 2012.

Early years
Meisner grew up in Detroit during the austere years of the Great Depression and World War II. But by the time he reached adulthood during the post-war boom, Detroit was a thriving center of culture as well as the auto industry. He remained in Detroit, enrolling at Wayne State University. An outstanding student, Meisner was admitted to a graduate program there after only two years of college.

However this was also the beginning of the Cold War and the Red Scare in the U.S., having serious repercussions on the personal lives of Maurice Meisner and his  wife Lorraine. As part of the McCarthy era investigations, Lorraine was subpoenaed before the House Un-American Activities Committee (HUAC) in 1952 in relation to her attendance at the World Festival of Youth and Students held in East Berlin the previous year. Like most witnesses called before hearings of HUAC or the Senate Internal Security Subcommittee (SISS), Lorraine Meisner refused to testify to the body. Although this assertion of her Fifth Amendment rights had no direct legal consequences, David Henry, president of Wayne State University where she was also a student, saw fit to expel her from the university. Although seen as an unusually harsh move even at the time, other schools were reluctant to admit a student dismissed under such circumstances.

The Meisners moved to Chicago after they had been accepted to study at the University of Chicago, where they both would eventually receive doctorates. Maurice Meisner undertook to study Chinese history at a time when this would be considered an obscure choice, but where the emerging significance of China might be discerned in the wake of the 1949 revolution and role of China in the Korean War. This included studying the Chinese language to do research and travel in order to collaborate with the rather few China scholars of the time.

Meisner's doctoral dissertation was prepared under the Sovietologist Leonard Haimson and developed in further year of research at the East Asian Research Center at Harvard. It was later published by Harvard University Press. In it, Meisner studied the original contributions to Chinese revolutionary theory by the co-founder of the Chinese Communist Party, Li Dazhao to show that the adaptation of Marxism to China which had been attributed to Mao Zedong had actually been accomplished by Li.

Maurice Meisner was an early member of the Committee of Concerned Asian Scholars (CCAS). In addition to opposing American participation in the Vietnam War, the group also involved itself in demystifying China at a time in which "Red China" was regularly portrayed as a threat to America, arguably surpassing the Soviet Union as a target of anti-communist sentiment toward the end of the 1960s. Meisner wrote for their publication, the Bulletin of Concerned Asian Scholars, and at the time of his death in 2012 he was still listed on the advisory board of the journal.

Beginning with an article in the 1963 The China Quarterly, he published articles in the leading journals in the field, including Asian Survey, Current History, Journal of Asian Studies, and Modern China, among others.

Main career
Meisner earned M.A. and Ph.D. degrees at the University of Chicago and was awarded fellowships at Harvard University and the Center for Advanced Study in the Behavioral Sciences (Stanford, California). In 1968 he left his first faculty position at the  University of Virginia to accept a professorship at the University of Wisconsin–Madison where he would remain for the rest of his career. He took sabbaticals at the Woodrow Wilson Center (1980) and at the London School of Economics (1999).

Teaching at the University of Wisconsin
In 1968 the nation was in a state of apprehension and unrest given the continuing war in Vietnam and movements for the empowerment of minorities. This was the same year as the Tet Offensive which became widely viewed as a psychological turning point in the Vietnam war and American public opinion, the assassination of Martin Luther King and its aftermath, anti-war protests and police violence at the Democratic National Convention in Chicago, and election of Richard Nixon as president. Protest activity on and off the university campuses was reaching a crescendo and Madison happened to be one of the most affected campuses, bolstered by its large student body which in large part came from outside of Wisconsin. Highlights included
militant protests against Dow Chemical which produced the napalm used in Vietnam, demonstrations and student strike demanding a Black Studies department at the university, a campus-wide strike by graduate assistants, the nationwide student strike following the 1970 U.S. invasion of Cambodia, and the 1970 bombing of the Army Math Research Center also in protest of the war. Radical politics was in the air, bringing to the fore radical organizations and ideologies ranging from anarchism to various Marxist currents.

Thus Maurice Meisner began teaching the history of the Chinese revolution not only at the very time when revolutionary politics was being widely explored and debated, but where the specifics of the Chinese revolution seemed very relevant to many radicalizing youth who were hardly enthralled by the nominally Marxist pro-Soviet Communist Party (which threw its electoral support to the Democratic Party). The Chinese Communist Party, in contrast, had denounced the Marxism of the Soviet Union as "revisionist," and Maoist groups were prominent among the more militant factions involved in protest actions and ideological debate. Interest in Meisner's Chinese history course was greatly bolstered by this perception of an international revolutionary pole headquartered in China along with Meisner's sympathy with the socialist goals underlying the Chinese revolution. Thus the one-time niche field of Chinese history gave way to a wider politically motivated audience requiring a large lecture hall.

1968 was during the Cultural Revolution in China, which received much fanfare among Western radicals but about which little was actually known. Many Maoists in the West found inspiration in the (perceived) role of the Red Guards, just as the English version of Mao's Red Book became widely toted as a revolutionary handbook. Competing Maoist groups in the U.S. (such as from the breakup of SDS) and the West attached themselves to the legacy of Mao Zedong and the cultural revolution, propelling interest in the recent history of China, the subject of Meisner's continuing research. As various absurdities and abuses committed during the Cultural Revolution became known, reactions of Maoist factions ranged from soul-searching to denial. Of obvious interest was Meisner's related research, although this was at a time when visiting the People's Republic was still impossible (as were visits by Chinese individuals to the West). Despite the difficulty in obtaining objective information, his study of the period made it into the classroom  and would be incorporated into his 1977 work Mao's China: A History of the People's Republic.

Post-Mao China
By the late 1970s not only had the earlier wave of campus radicalism subsided, but definite changes were underway in China which were troubling, at best, to the remaining American Maoist currents and the so-called New Communist Movement which had emerged from the remnants of the New Left. Fascination with the cultural revolution had benefited from popular perceptions and slogans at a time when direct contact with Chinese communists was sparse, but in the years following Richard Nixon's China visit that began to change. With the death of Mao and the defeat of the Gang of Four, the political course of China was to rapidly change, whereas Western observers, both on the right and on the left, were often unable or unwilling to recognize the enormity of the transformation that had begun. This was just as Meisner's major work Mao's China was going to press, documenting the history and dynamics of the Chinese revolution up to that point.

A subsequent edition of that book published in 1985 included additional chapters addressing the aftermath of the power struggle, but which still saw the market reforms instituted by Deng Xiaoping as a tactical turn in the development of socialism. Following some years of China's accelerating economic and political evolution, however, Meisner's assessment of the entire period became more sober as he traced the rise of what he termed "bureaucratic capitalism," albeit under the official banner of building "socialism with Chinese characteristics." Indeed, he saw the economic transformations underway as having set the stage for the democracy movement of 1989. The curious evolution of socialist China towards capitalism, all the while maintaining Communist Party rule, was the subject of Meisner's 1996 work The Deng Xiaoping Era: An Inquiry into the Fate of Chinese Socialism, 1978-1994.

Meisner was himself in Beijing in 1989 up until a week before the crackdown on the democracy movement. His analysis of the protest movement contradicted both the official characterization of it as  a "counterrevolutionary rebellion"  and the Western media's inclination to depict any movement for greater democracy as welcoming of capitalism. Rather than simple concerns for greater democracy, the movement was propelled by a disgust of privilege attained by powerful bureaucrats which was seen as official corruption, and in fact a result of the market reforms. Meisner writes:
[Calls against] "Corruption" now conveyed a moral condemnation of the whole system of bureaucratic privilege and power.... But now that Communist leaders, high and low, were so deeply enmeshed in profiteering in the presumably "free" marketplace, they had gone well beyond the bounds of politico-ethical legitimacy in popular perceptions. The use of political power for private gain was viewed as unfair and unjust, and it inflamed slumbering resentments against bureaucratic privilege.

Harvey Goldberg

It was not only students and young people involved in the tumultuous social/political struggles permeating the campus during the 1960s and 70s. The issues rocking the campus naturally created divisions among academics, and most particularly those in history and the other the social sciences where the sorts of issues being played out on the streets were the very subject of academic instruction. In this context one can easily appreciate that Maurice Meisner would have connected to like-minded colleagues in the history department, resulting in a personal friendship with Professor Harvey Goldberg whose study of social movements in modern Europe mirrored Meisner's similar study of contemporary China. Goldberg was very well known and became extremely popular among radical students who would pack his lecture hall as he delivered his memorable orations which often took less the form of history lectures than as passionate political statements.

Their friendship endured well past the heyday of campus activism, with them spending considerable time together as Goldberg's health suffered toward the late 1980s. Struck by the death of his friend in 1987, Meisner was instrumental in establishing the Harvey Goldberg Center for the Study of Contemporary History to honor and remember the beloved professor. In the spirit of Harvey Goldberg, the center would go on to sponsor quite a number of speakers, conferences and symposia especially around issues of social concern, connecting the study of history and society with activism as well as maintaining an archive of Goldberg's work. Maurice Meisner assumed the title of Harvey Goldberg Professor of History for the remainder of his university career.

Towards the end of his life, in 2009, a conference was held in honor of Meisner's distinguished career entitled "Reflections on History and Contemporary Change in China Before and After Tiananmen." The four-day conference, co-sponsored by the Harvey Goldberg Center, included a number of Meisner's former students, now themselves noted scholars of Chinese history. Following that conference three of Meisner's former students undertook to author and edit a book entitled Radicalism, Revolution, and Reform in Modern China: Essays in Honor of Maurice Meisner. The authors presented Meisner with an early copy of the book honoring him in 2011, the year before he died.

Major works
Li Ta-Chao and the Origins of Chinese Marxism. Harvard East Asian Series, 27. (Cambridge: Harvard University Press, 1967).
with Rhoads Murphey, eds. The Mozartian Historian: Essays on the Works of Joseph R. Levenson. (Berkeley: University of California Press, 1976). .
Mao's China: A History of the People's Republic (New York: Free Press, 1977; revised 2nd ed. 1986). .
Mao's China and After: A History of the People's Republic. (New York: Free Press, 3rd ed., 1999). .
Marxism, Maoism, and Utopianism: Eight Essays. (Madison: University of Wisconsin Press, 1982). .
The Deng Xiaoping Era: An Inquiry into the Fate of Chinese Socialism, 1978-1994. (New York: Hill and Wang, 1996). .
Mao Zedong: A Political and Intellectual Portrait. (Cambridge; Malden, MA: Polity, 2007). .

References

External links
Meisner, Maurice (2007) The Place of Communism in Chinese History: Reflections on the Past and Future of the People's Republic of China, (27 pages) Macalester International: Vol. 18, Article 8.
Meisner, Maurice (1999) The significance of the Chinese revolution in world history Working Paper, 1. (13 pages) Asia Research Centre, London School of Economics and Political Science, London, UK.
Obituary: Maurice Meisner, historian of modern China, dies at 80 by Susannah Brooks, University of Wisconsin–Madison News
Harvey Goldberg Center at University of Wisconsin History Department

1931 births
2012 deaths
American historians
Writers about China
American Maoists
American sinologists
Historians of China
Jewish American historians
American male non-fiction writers
Jewish socialists
Wayne State University alumni
University of Chicago alumni
Academics of the London School of Economics
University of Virginia faculty
University of Wisconsin–Madison faculty
People from Detroit